Devereux is an 1829 historical novel by the British writer Edward Bulwer-Lytton, published in three volumes. It takes place during the reign of Queen Anne and partly revolves around a secret Jacobite plot to place the pretender James Stuart on the throne. He earned £1,500 for the novel from his publisher Henry Colburn, trebling his earnings from the successful silver fork novel Pelham of the previous year. He dedicated it to his friend the Canadian traveller and writer John Auldjo, then living in Naples. The story of a sibling rivalry between three brothers may have been influenced by Bulwer-Lytton's own upbringing.

References

Bibliography
 Copeland, Edward. The Silver Fork Novel: Fashionable Fiction in the Age of Reform. Cambridge University Press, 2012.
 Huckvale, David. A Dark and Stormy Oeuvre: Crime, Magic and Power in the Novels of Edward Bulwer-Lytton. McFarland, 2015.

1829 British novels
British historical novels
Novels set in London
Novels by Edward Bulwer-Lytton
Novels set in the 18th century